The 7th Military Region is a military region of Armed Forces of Yemen. Its headquarters is in Dhamar Governorate.

History 
The 7th region was established in 2013. On 10 April 2013 President Abdrabbuh Mansur Hadi issued a republication decree to restructure the military field into seven regions, including the 7th Military Region. The region is headquartered in Dhamar city and supervises the military formations in Dhamar, al-Baydah, Sanaa, and Ibb Governorates.

Structure 
The region basically consists of 7 military brigades, including; 30th Armored Brigade, 9th Infantry Brigade, 55 and 61 Artillery Brigades.

Commanders 

 Major General Ali Mohsen Ali Muthana (10 April 2013–2016)
 Major General Ismael al-Zahzuh (8 November 2016–23 August 2017)
 Major General Nasser al-Dhaibani (23 August 2017–5 August 2018)
 Major General Mohsen al-Khubi (5 August 2018–27 January 2020)
 Major General Ahmed Hassan Jubran (27 January 2020–22 December 2021)
 Major General Mohammed Rasam (22 December 2021–incumbent)

See also 

 1st Military Region
 2nd Military Region
 3rd Military Region
 4th Military Region
 5th Military Region
 6th Military Region

References 

Military regions of Yemen
Military of Yemen
Ministry of Defense (Yemen)
2013 establishments in Yemen